Rugby passes may refer to play in different sports:

Passes in rugby league
Passes in rugby union